Fudblski klub Železničar Pančevo is a Serbian football club, based in the city of Pančevo. They currently compete in the second division Serbian First League.

History
Železničar was founded in 1947. And during its history, club mostly competed in lower ranks. They qualified for the Serbian First League for the first time in season 2020–21  after finishing first in Serbian League Vojvodina in previous season.

Honours

National
Serbian League Vojvodina: 2019–20

Players

Current squad

References

External links
 FK Železničar at Srbijasport
 FK Železničar at Srbijafudbal

1947 establishments in Serbia
Association football clubs established in 1947
Football clubs in Serbia
Sport in Vojvodina